QTC may refer to:
Quantum Tunneling Composite
QTc, a time measurement of a portion of a heartbeat
Queensland Theological College
Queensland Turf Club
Quinnipiac tribal council
The radio Q code for a pending message count